Fort St. John may refer to:

 Fort St. John, British Columbia, a city in British Columbia, Canada
 Spanish Fort, New Orleans, also known as Fort St. John, a historic place in New Orleans, Louisiana, United States
 Fort St. John Group, a stratigraphical unit of the Western Canadian Sedimentary Basin

See also
 Fort Saint-Jean (disambiguation)
 Fort San Juan (disambiguation)
 Forte de São João (disambiguation)